Key Bank Center, formerly the Puget Sound National Bank Building, is a 16-floor high-rise in Tacoma, Washington. When completed as the National Realty Building in 1911, the  tower was the tallest building in the state of Washington until surpassed by Seattle's Smith Tower in 1914. Key Bank later sold the tower and moved into the building at the corner (1101 Pacific) which now houses the South Puget Sound District Offices of Key Bank as well as its Tacoma Main Branch office.

The tower, with marble quarried in Alaska, was designed by Frederick Heath.

References

External links

 Images from 1926 at the Tacoma Public Library Image Archives

Buildings and structures in Tacoma, Washington
Commercial buildings completed in 1911
Frederick Heath buildings
1911 establishments in Washington (state)
Skyscrapers in Washington (state)
Skyscraper office buildings in Washington (state)